Back on the Strip is an upcoming American comedy film starring Spence Moore II, Tiffany Haddish, JB Smoove, Faizon Love, Wesley Snipes, and Kevin Hart, directed and co-written by Chris Spencer in his feature film directorial debut, and produced by Snipes and Haddish with Luminosity Entertainment.

Synopsis
Merlin moved to Las Vegas in the hopes of becoming a famous magician but gets waylaid by his natural gifts and a place with the black male strippers The Chocolate Chips.

Cast

 Spence Moore II as Merlin 
 Wesley Snipes as Luther "Mr. Big" 
 Tiffany Haddish as Verna
 Kevin Hart as Uptight Dad
 JB Smoove as Amos
 Faizon Love as Desmond
 Bill Bellamy as Tyriq
 Gary Owen as Xander
 Piper Curda as Gia
 Emelina Adams as Bambi
 Colleen Camp as Rita
 Caryn Ward as Eve

Production 
Eric Daniel and Chris Spencer co-wrote the film with Spencer also directing. Wesley Snipes and Tiffany Haddish appear in and co-produce the movie. Producers for Luminosity Entertainment are Geno Taylor and Missy Valdez. Speaking at the Oscar ceremony in 2022 Snipes confirmed that filming had been completed and he played a one-legged member of the strip group The Chocolate Chips, he also confirmed a role for Kevin Hart in the movie. In August, 2022 Emelina Adams confirmed a role in the film and that she filmed on location in Vegas.

References

External links

Upcoming films
American comedy films
American independent films
Films about striptease
Films set in the Las Vegas Valley
Films shot in the Las Vegas Valley
Upcoming directorial debut films
Upcoming English-language films